Eric Kyle Szmanda (born July 24, 1975) is an American actor. He is best known for having played Greg Sanders in the CBS police drama CSI: Crime Scene Investigation, a role he held from the show's beginning in 2000 until it ended in 2015.

Early life and education
Szmanda was born in Milwaukee, Wisconsin, to Elaine (née Enders) and Donald Szmanda, and has two brothers, Brett and Robert.  His great-uncle Ray Szmanda was the "Menard's Guy," a local celebrity in the Midwest famous for his enthusiastic ads for Menard's, a chain of hardware stores.

When Eric was very young, the family moved to Mukwonago, Wisconsin. He attended Mukwonago High School and subsequently Carroll College in Waukesha, Wisconsin. While he was in school, he began marketing internships with music conglomerate BMG and moved to Chicago, Illinois, to take a full-time job in the music business. 

Szmanda attended classes for four years at the American Academy of Dramatic Arts in Pasadena, California, and graduated.

Career
In his first role on television, Szmanda starred in The Net, a series based on the 1995 film of the same name.

In 2000, Szmanda began a recurring role in the CBS police drama CSI: Crime Scene Investigation in the first two seasons as Greg Sanders, a DNA technician and investigator. He was subsequently added to the main cast in the third season. He remained on the show until it ended after the fifteenth season in September 2015.

Activism
Szmanda supports the U.S. Campaign for Burma and traveled to Thailand to see the conditions of Burmese refugees who have fled their native country.

Szmanda showed his support for Animal Defenders International (ADI) in March 2017 along with former CSI co-star Jorja Fox. The two helped to host a benefit to raise money for the charity that aims to help and save animals all over the world from circuses and from other forms of animal cruelty. He and Fox attended the White House to help put forward a bill to stop circuses from using animals and protect them.

Filmography

Film and television credits

Video games

Stage

References

External links
 Eric Szmanda Bio at CBS - CSI: Crime Scene Investigation
 

1975 births
Male actors from Milwaukee
American male film actors
Male models from Wisconsin
American male television actors
Living people
People from Mukwonago, Wisconsin